Wael Hamdan Ibrahim Al-Dahdouh (born; April 30, 1970) is a Palestinian journalist and the bureau chief of Al Jazeera in Gaza City.

Early life and education
Wael Hamdan al-Dahdouh was born on April 30, 1970, in the Zaytoun neighborhood, the oldest neighborhood of Gaza City. He grew up in a well-off Gazan family, whose origins are from the Arabian Peninsula. He received his primary and secondary education in several schools in Gaza City. He spent seven years in the prisons of the Israeli occupation immediately after obtaining his high school diploma in 1988. He again obtained a high school diploma in an Israeli prison. He received BA in journalism and media from the Islamic University of Gaza in 1998, after the occupation prevented him from traveling to study abroad he received a master's degree in regional studies from Al-Quds University, Abu Dis, in 2007.

Career 
Al-Dahdouh started work for the press in 1998. He worked for the Palestinian newspaper Al-Quds as a correspondent in Gaza, and wrote for other Palestinian magazines, then worked as a correspondent for the radio Voice of Palestine, as well as for Sahar satellite channel at the beginning of the Al-Aqsa Intifada in 2000. He also worked as a correspondent for the Al Arabiya in 2003, then moved to work as a reporter and official in the Al-Jazeera office in the Gaza Strip since 2004.

Awards and honors
 Peace Through Media Award (2013) by the International Media Awards in London
 Hamas Award from Khalil al-Hayya, deputy head of Hamas in Gaza. (2021)

References

External links 
 

Living people
1970 births
People from Gaza City
Al Jazeera people
Palestinian reporters and correspondents
Islamic University of Gaza alumni
Al-Quds University alumni